Marek Chrobak is a full professor at University of California, Riverside. He is known for his work competitive analysis of online algorithms, particularly for the k-server problem, on information dissemination in ad-hoc radio networks, and on graph drawing.

In automata theory, Chrobak is known for his contributions to the study of finite automata over a one-letter alphabet. In particular, "Chrobak normal form" for nondeterministic finite automata is known.

Chrobak obtained his PhD in Computer Science from Warsaw University in 1985.

References

External links
 
 Bibliography of papers on online algorithms
 
 
 
 
 

Year of birth missing (living people)
Living people
University of California, Riverside faculty
University of Warsaw alumni